Licania conferruminata is a species of plant in the family Chrysobalanaceae. It is endemic to Brazil.

References

Endemic flora of Brazil
conferruminata
Vulnerable plants
Taxonomy articles created by Polbot
Taxobox binomials not recognized by IUCN